

April 
 27 April-3 May: EuroBasket 1947 : USSR

Winners of major team competitions 1946–1947

Men 
Americas
Basketball Association of America : Philadelphia Warriors

Europe
 France : Paris UC
 Greece : Panathinaikos B.C.
 Italy : Virtus Pallacanestro Bologna
 USSR : SKIF Kaunas
 Yugoslavia : KK Red Star Belgrade

College
 NCAA
NCAA tournament: Holy Cross 58,  47
Most Outstanding Player: George Kaftan, Holy Cross
National Invitation Tournament:  49, Kentucky 45
 NAIA
NAIA: Marshall 73,  59

Women 
Europe
 France : US Métro Paris
 Italy : Bernocchi Legnano

See also

 1947 in sports

References